Antoine Paul (21 December 1798, in Marseille – November 1871, in Anet) known as Paul, was a French ballet dancer. After dancing in Lyon and Bordeaux, Paul débuted at the Opéra de Paris in 1820 and quickly became one of the public's favourite premiers danseurs. Nicknamed "l'Aérien" due to his technical qualities, August Bournonville stated "Paul's superiority is his lightness, elasticity, speed, softness and precision. He knows how to combine daring and natural grace." He regularly performed in London, with partners including his sister Madame Montessu and Madame Anatole, as well as at Naples, where he was praised by  Stendhal. He retired from the stage in 1831.

1798 births
1871 deaths
French male ballet dancers
19th-century French ballet dancers
Entertainers from Marseille
Paris Opera Ballet étoiles